Recey-sur-Ource is a commune in the Côte-d'Or department in eastern France.

Geography
The village lies in the middle of the commune, on the right bank of the Ource, which flows northwest through the middle of the commune.

Population

International relations
The commune is twinned with Nieder-Olm, Germany.

Personalities
It was the birthplace of Jean-Baptiste Henri Lacordaire (1802-1861), ecclesiastic and orator.

See also
Communes of the Côte-d'Or department

References

Communes of Côte-d'Or
Champagne (province)